River Grove is a station on Metra's North Central Service and Milwaukee District West Line in River Grove, Illinois. In Metra's zone-based fare system, River Grove is in zone C. As of 2018, River Grove is the 138th busiest of Metra's 236 non-downtown stations, with an average of 333 weekday boardings.

On the Milwaukee District West Line, as of December 12, 2022, River Grove is served by 41 trains (20 inbound, 21 outbound) on weekdays, by all 24 trains (12 in each direction) on Saturdays, and by all 18 trains (nine in each direction) on Sundays and holidays.

On the North Central Service, as of December 12, 2022, River Grove is served by 12 trains (six in each direction) on weekdays.

West of the station, the North Central Service diverges from the ex-Milwaukee Road's Chicago-Omaha-Kansas City mainline at the B-12 junction in Franklin Park, Illinois and proceeds north on the Canadian National Railway's Waukesha Subdivision, with the Milwaukee District West Line continuing to the west. The station is located across the tracks from Arnold Avenue on the corner of Illinois State Route 171, and is surrounded by the local St. Joseph's Cemetery. It is also located across from Elmwood Cemetery.

Bus connections
Pace

References

External links 

Station from Thatcher Avenue from Google Maps Street View

Metra stations in Illinois
Former Chicago, Milwaukee, St. Paul and Pacific Railroad stations
Railway stations in Cook County, Illinois
Railway stations in the United States opened in 1946